Rondeletia racemosa is a species of plant in the family Rubiaceae. It is endemic to Jamaica.  It is threatened by habitat loss.

References

Flora of Jamaica
racemosa
Vulnerable plants
Endemic flora of Jamaica
Taxonomy articles created by Polbot
Taxa named by Olof Swartz